The Skiff Racing Association (SRA) is the governing body in the United Kingdom for the sport of skiff racing. The SRA is affiliated to British Rowing. The objectives of the SRA are
(a)	To maintain the standard of sculling in skiff and kindred races
(b)	To promote the interests of skiff racing and kindred sports

History

The SRA was founded on 6 February 1901 by delegates from a number of clubs and regattas under the leadership of F. S. Lowe. The SRA affiliated to the ARA (the predecessor of British Rowing) almost immediately. In the founding year there were eleven affiliations.
Broxbourne Rowing Club 
Maidenhead Rowing Club
Reading Rowing Club
The Skiff Club
Bourne End Regatta
Cookham Regatta
Sunbury Regatta
Wargrave Regatta
Windsor and Eton Regatta
Teddington Reach Amateur Aquatic Sports
Hampton Court and Dittons Amateur Aquatic Sports and Venetian Fete

The club and regatta affiliations have changed over the years with new clubs and regattas joining and old ones leaving.

Constitution

The SRA publishes a handbook to ensure that a standard set of rules is applied for racing and boat construction.

The Association is run by a committee elected from the affiliated clubs and regattas at an annual meeting. A sub-committee deals specifically with the rules of racing and of the Association, and with the recruitment, training, testing and appointment of umpires for skiff racing. The rules of racing are based on those of British Rowing closely enough that BR qualified umpires may also umpire skiff races.

Status system

The SRA operates a status system to allow scullers to compete with those of a similar standard.  The status levels are (high to low) Senior, Higher, Intermediate, Novice and Entrant. When first starting skiff racing, competitors are Entrant status unless they have previously won a non-junior event under British Rowing rules. When competitors gain sufficient points, they are promoted to the next highest level. Competitors gain a full point by winning a qualifying race (a regatta race with more than 2 entries).  There is also a classification for Veteran events (competitors aged over 40).

SRA events

The SRA runs three events - the Inter-Club competition, and the Singles and Doubles Marathons. All other events are organised by affiliated clubs or regattas. 
 
The Inter-Club competition has team awards for Gentleman's Singles (Lowe Cup), Gentlemen's Doubles (Davis Cup), Ladies Singles (Penny Chuter Cup) and Ladies Doubles (Churchill Cup). The Singles Marathon is competed for the Jack Rosewell Trophy, and the Doubles Marathon for the Heldmann Trophy.

In addition the SRA supervises the Ormiston Trophy which is awarded to the Club that wins the highest number of points in events each season, and the "Most Improved Skiffer" award.

Current affiliated organisations

 The Skiff Club 
 Thames Valley Skiff Club 
 Wraysbury Skiff and Punting Club 
 Dittons Skiff and Punting Club
 Wargrave Boating Club
 Granta Skiff Club
 Sunbury Skiff and Punting Club
 Egham Regatta
 Sunbury Amateur Regatta 
 Chertsey Regatta
 Hampton Court and Dittons Regatta
 Skiff Championships Regatta (formerly Teddington Reach Regatta)
 Wraysbury and Old Windsor Regatta
 Walton Reach Regatta

References

External links
 The Skiff Racing Association
British Rowing homepage

Rowing in the United Kingdom
Rowing governing bodies
Sports governing bodies in the United Kingdom
1901 establishments in the United Kingdom